Maximiano Alves (22 August 1888 – 22 January 1954) was a Portuguese sculptor.

Biography

Alves was born in Lisbon.  He was the son of the engraver of the mint.  He finished his course on sculpture at Lisbon School of Fine Arts in 1911, where he attended with a sculptor Simões de Almeida (his uncle) and two painters Luciano Freire and Ernesto Condeixa.

He was awarded with a rank of an official of the Order of Christ, later he took part in the conception and execution of the Great War Monument in Lisbon.

He took part in artistic works in different periodical publications, one example was a review Alma Nova which was published in Faro in 1914.

Expositions
He took part in different expositions including:

Ibero-American Exposition of 1929, in 1929
International and Colonial Exposition, Paris, in 1931
Portuguese World Exhibition, Lisbon. in 1940

Selected works
 Monument to the Fallen Victims of the Great War, Lisbon, 1931
 Fountain at Alviela Canal, Sacavém, 1940
 Sculptures of the Monumental Fountain, Alameda D. Afonso Henriques, Lisboa, c. 1940
 Bust of Marechal Carmona
 Bust of Cesário Verde, Lisbon, 1955
 Bust of D. João da Câmara, Lisbon, 1953
 Bust of Alfredo Augusto Freire de Andrade
At the João de Deus Museum-School:
 Bust of Casimiro Freire
 Bust of Pedro Gomes da Silva
At the Museu da Marinha (Marine Museum)
 Statue of Vasco da Gama
 Statue of D. Manuel I
 Statue of Afonso de Albuquerque
At the Palácio de São Bento
 Statue of Diplomacy (Estátua da Diplomacia), at the "Hall of Sessions" (Sala das Sessões)
 Statue of "Força" ("Strength") at the entrance 
 Bust of António Cândido, in the atrium
 Bust of Hintze Ribeiro, in the atrium

In Cape Verde:
 Monument to Dr. António Lereno, at António Loreno Square in the city of Praia
In Macau:
 Monument to the governor João Maria Ferreira do Amaral, 1940
 Monument to Vicente Nicolau de Mesquita, 1940

Monument to the Fallen Victims of the Great War, Lisbon

Sculptures, Monumental Fountain, Lisbon

Força, Palácio de S. Bento, Lisbon

References

Bibliography
 Bethencourt, Francisco, Chaudhuri, Kirti, dir – A História da expansão Portuguesa (History of the Portuguese Expansion). Lisboa, Circle of Letters, 1998
 Saial, Joaquim – Estatuária Portuguesa dos Anos 30 (1926–1940) (Portuguese Statues in the 1930s (1926–1940)). Lisbon, Bertrand, 1991

External links
Revelar Lx 

Portuguese sculptors
Male sculptors
People from Lisbon
1888 births
1954 deaths